Carte Goodwin (born 1974) was a U.S. Senator from West Virginia in 2010. Senator Goodwin or Goodwyn may also refer to:

Albert Taylor Goodwyn (1842–1931), Alabama State Senate
Alexander T. Goodwin (1837–1899), New York State Senate
Angier Goodwin (1881–1975), Massachusetts State Senate
Edward E. Goodwyn (1902–1961), Virginia State Senate
Greta Goodwin (1936–2010), Kansas State Senate
John Noble Goodwin (1824–1887), Maine State Senate
Maryellen Goodwin (born 1964), Rhode Island State Senate
Tom Goodwin (New Jersey politician) (born 1951), New Jersey State Senate
William S. Goodwin (1866–1937), Arkansas State Senate

See also
Senator Godwin (disambiguation)